The 1965–66 season was the 51st in the history of the Isthmian League, an English football competition.

Leytonstone were champions, winning their ninth Isthmian League title.

League table

References

Isthmian League seasons
I